Judith Ann Rudoe FSA (born April 1951) is a curator in the British Museum and a specialist in the history of jewellery.

Selected publications
 Charlemagne's Europe. British Museum Publications, London, 1975. 
 Decorative Arts 1850–1950: A Catalogue of the British Museum collection. British Museum Press, London, 1991. 
 Cartier 1900–39. British Museum Press, London, 1997. 
 Jewellery in the Age of Queen Victoria: A Mirror to the World. British Museum Press, London, 2010. (With Charlotte Gere)

References 

Living people
English curators
Employees of the British Museum
1951 births
Fellows of the Society of Antiquaries of London
20th-century English educators
20th-century English historians
20th-century English women
20th-century English people
21st-century English women
21st-century English people